The nerve to obturator internus, also known as the obturator internus nerve, is a nerve that innervates the obturator internus and gemellus superior muscles.

Structure
The nerve to obturator internus originates in the lumbosacral plexus. It arises from the ventral divisions of the fifth lumbar and first and second sacral nerves.

It leaves the pelvis through the greater sciatic foramen below the piriformis muscle, and gives off the branch to the gemellus superior, which enters the upper part of the posterior surface of the muscle.

It then crosses the ischial spine, re-enters the pelvis through the lesser sciatic foramen, and pierces the pelvic surface of the obturator internus.

See also
 Obturator nerve
 Nerve to quadratus femoris

References

Nerves of the lower limb and lower torso